Tilemsi  is a commune in the Cercle of Gao in the Gao Region of south-eastern Mali. The principal town lies at Tine Aouker. As of 1998 the commune had a population of 2,088.

Creation

The rural commune Tilemsi enshrined in Act No. 96-059 of 4 November 1996 on the creation of Municipalities in the Republic of Mali is the result of the bursting of the Borough of Djébock in the Circle Gao in two towns rural (and Anchawadj Tilemsi). Its main town is located in Tin Aouker the fossil valley Tilemsi on transsaharienne 70 km north of the city of Gao.
The rural commune Tilemsi is limited:
- To the north by the rural commune of Tarkint;
- To the south by the rural commune of Anchawadj;
- To the east by the rural communes of Anefis (Circle of Kidal) and Alata (Circle Menaka)
- To the west by the rural communes of Soni Ali Ber (Circle Gao) and Taboye (Circle Bourem).

Geography
The rural commune Tilemsi has very modest relief composed of large expanses of plains (fossil valley Tilemsi) and a few trays means recognized and appreciated by the quality of their herbaceous (Azawa).

The rural commune Tilemsi knows a Sahelian climate characterized by alternating two seasons. A dry season from 10 to 11 months and a rainy season from 1 to 2 months with rain precipitation rarely reaching 100 mm of water per year. Average annual temperatures vary in the range of 30 to 45 °C. The main harmattan winds and the monsoon.

Very poor vegetation in the valley Tilemsi, it consists of thorny shrubs in places while we note the presence of a grassy savanna.
 
The rural commune Tilemsi has some temporary pools and wadis using fallback area for livestock during the dry season around which settled communities.

Demography
The rural commune Tilemsi has a population of 16,411 inhabitants on the basis of a fiscal administrative census conducted by the municipality in March 2004. White and black population both composed mainly of Tuareg and Arabs. The main dominant religion is Islam. The main migration flows are directed to neighboring towns and Anchawadj Gao, Niger, Algeria and Libya.

Economy
The rural municipality has 07 sectors Tilemsi pastoral and agro-development:

- Agharous (Agharous – Tin Adhidj – Fèsenfès – Inhouchawène);
- Azerzi (Amasrakad – Tadakamat – Tawardé);
- Alata (Ernadjef – Tin Alher – Tidjalalène);
- Tilemsi (Tin-Aouker Intaghat – Ardjabech – Tinersane);
- Inabarem (Tin Adjhanan – Intamat);
- Intesimt (Inadalab – Ifardane – Talhaninit);
- Assalwa (Ebaghaw Afer-Tin – Tidjerwène – Ifalawlawène)

For breeding, first activity on cattle, sheep, goats, donkeys, camels, it is like the other depends on the lack of equipment, organization and training of farmers. Agriculture focuses on sorghum and cowpea recession. To this is added the agriculture practiced in some gardening sites.

The city has several weekly markets in Tin Aouker Tidjerwène and Amasrakad which sell grain, livestock, textiles and other products (tea, sugar, tobacco). The main areas of supply are Gao and southern Algeria.

Picking is less important compared with other activities because Tilemsi has fewer grasses and acacias, source collection.

Crafts focus on the leather products (bags, shoes, pillows, bags ...) and products of the forge (knives, hoes, dabas, hoes, rakes, hoes, axes ....)

The city has only one park located Tin Aouker vaccination. Its poor geographical position in relation to pasture leads farmers to vaccinate their animals in the neighboring towns with all the problems that pose. La area has no deposit veterinarian. The supply of vaccines and veterinary products is from the city of Gao.

Commune by the pastoral has no hydro-agricultural development. Agriculture is subsistence type and practiced by a minority of the population.
With regard to water projects Commune has twenty pastoral wells, ten boreholes with pump in India or Dubai and two solar pumps.
These boreholes and wells unevenly distributed not cover the water needs of people and livestock. They know issues or maintenance of their equipment.
 
Tin market Aouker received 4 hangars built by the NGO Tassaght and Project Development Support Local needs and other amenities such as shops, additional hangars and warehouses.

Cereal banks are provided under the Commune in stores and cereal banks. The few stores that are unevenly distributed can not meet the demand of the people. These stores are mostly victims of mismanagement, lack of supervision and poor organization of beneficiaries.
  
The city has never owned a decentralized financial system. All loans towards populations are taken from a bank Gao (BNDA) located 70 km from the capital. These loans are with exorbitant interest creating more problems than solutions.

The rural commune Tilemsi ties based on social and traditional cultural and agro complementarities with 13 villages in the rural commune of Soni Ali Ber Circle Gao (Zindiga, Berrah Seyna, Batal, Magnadoué, Kokorom, Kochakarey, Forgho Arma Forgho Songhoy, Hamakouladji, Mbaldé, Kareybandia, Bagnadji) as well as villages and ethnocultural groups in the rural commune of Taboye and Circle Bourem.

The rural commune Tilemsi share farming as their main activity and production of wealth with the rural communes of neighboring pastoral Tarkint (Circle Bourem) of Anefis (Circle of Kidal), Alata (Circle of Menaka) and Anchawadj (Circle Gao).

Society
Constraints are:
- Weakness and lack of agricultural products;
- Lack of pasture;
- Significant loss of livestock due to disease outbreaks;
- Low income people;
- Enclosing and remoteness of some areas lack of rural roads;
- Food insecurity;

Despite its size the municipality has only one Community Health Centre located in town (Tin Aouker). The Health Centre by its geographical position does not meet all the demands of the people. Other sites are required to bring their patients in health centers in neighboring towns.

The rural commune Tilemsi has 13 primary schools and Second Cycle in main town. All these schools have been built with the advent of decentralization and face problems of equipment and Teachers.

The erection of Tin Aouker Tilemsi Circle in the Gao Region with 02 Districts is a democratic demand of its people:
-Tin-District Aouker, Chief town Aouker Tin with 02 rural communes namely Tilemsi and Fèsenfès;
-District of Azerzi, Chief town Amasrakad with 02 rural communes namely Amasrakad and Tinadhidj;

Administrative reform and the deepening of decentralization provide the best opportunity to build the City Circle in Tilemsi same name under all the advantages that only need to be valued and capitalized only service of peace, security, democracy and development in our country;

The recent creation of the Region of Menaka and Circle Almoustarat, making both borders with the territory of the Municipality Tilemsi offers for the same reasons an opportunity to create beneficial circle for Tilemsi ensures better administration and management issues of peace, security and development on the one hand but also to strengthen the role and place of buffer and stabilization Tilemsi between the three regions of Gao, Kidal and Menaka.

Our country is facing major challenges: combat poverty, fight against insecurity, complete decentralization and deepen democracy. The erection of the City Circle in Tilemsi takes into account all these issues and proceeds from the Malian Government's political will to involve people and communities in the management of power in the administration closer to its users:

The erection of the rural commune Circle Tilemsi be a valuable contribution because it not only helps to reinforce the important role already undertaken by people and politicians in the fight against insecurity, but also to create the conditions of deepening and consolidation;

This will also erect a deepening of decentralization and democracy through the promotion of social and economic balances as at local and regional level.

Notable people

- Mohamed Ahmed Al Asal, Customary Chief of the Tribe and rear Chamanamass Grand father Ag Sidalamine Zeidan, spokesman for the National Pact of 11 April 1992 and signed Agreements Bourem 11 January 1995;
- Kiyou said Ayyad Ag Mohamed Ahmed, Chief Tribe Chamanamass, Gold Medal of Independence (Gold Medal No. 197) according to Decree No. 107/PR of 21 September 1966, father of the current mayor of the rural commune Tilemsi Almoumine Kiyou Ag and Ag Ikna older brother Mohamed Ahmed, the father of Ag Sidalamine Ikna whose name is related to the education of children of the tribe.

References

Communes of Gao Region